Arthur Woodward may refer to:

 Arthur Smith Woodward (1864–1944), English palaeontologist
 Arthur Woodward (footballer) (1906–1984), English professional footballer
 Arthur C. Woodward (1883–1950), minor league baseball player and American football and basketball coach